Elton Clay Fax (October 9, 1909 – May 13, 1993) was an American illustrator, cartoonist, and writer.

Early life and education
Elton Clay Fax was born in 1909, in Baltimore, Maryland, the son of Mark Oakland Fax and Willie Estelle Fax. His father was a stevedore at the Baltimore Railroad Depot; his mother was a seamstress. Elton Fax graduated from Frederick Douglass High School in 1926, where he was classmates with Cab Calloway, who became a noted musician. 

Fax first attended Claflin College, a historically black college in Orangeburg, South Carolina, but transferred north to Syracuse University in New York state. There he earned a Bachelor of Fine Arts degree in 1931. Soon after college he was featured in a solo art show at the offices of the Baltimore Afro-American newspaper.

Career
Elton Fax taught art at the Harlem Community Art Center in New York beginning in 1934. He also worked with the Works Project Administration (WPA) Federal Art Project, a government financial assistance program for artists during the Great Depression. Fax was an illustrator for magazines such as Weird Tales, Astounding Science-Fiction, Complete Cowboy, Real Western, Story Parade, Child Life, and All Sports. 

In 1942 he began a newspaper comic named Susabelle, and later an illustrated history panel, They'll Never Die; both were carried in African-American newspapers. He also created greeting card illustrations for The Links.

During the 1940s Fax worked for several comic companies as a cartoonist, including Continental Features Syndicate, a group that sold comic books throughout black communities. Some other companies he worked for as a cartoonist included Funnies Inc., Quality Comics, and Novelty Comics.

Books written and illustrated by Fax include West African Vignettes (1960), Contemporary Black Leaders (1970), Seventeen Black Artists (1972), Garvey (1972, a biography of Marcus Garvey), Through Black Eyes: Journeys of a Black Artist to East Africa and Russia (1974), Black Artists of the New Generation (1977), and Hashar (1980).  

In addition, Fax illustrated books by such children's authors as Georgene Faulkner and Verna Aardema. He also created dust jacket art for various publishers, as well as a literacy pamphlet for the Pan American Union. Books illustrated by Fax include Paul Cuffee: America's first black captain (1970), by Johanna Johnston, and Take a walk in their shoes (1989), by Glennette Turner. 

From 1949 to 1956, Fax was a "chalk talk artist" with the New York Times Children's Book Program.As he presented stories to children's groups, he also spontaneously illustrated them. 

Fax was sponsored by the US State Department for travel in Latin America in 1955, and a period as a lecturer in East Africa in 1963. After living in Mexico and traveling through Bolivia, Argentina, and Uruguay, Fax wrote in his article, "It's Been a Beautiful but Rugged Journey," about feeling concerned after the United States Embassy asked him if he had seen any "communist activity". 

While in East Africa in 1963, he also he toured Nigeria with jazz musician Randy Weston, sponsored by the American Society of African Culture. He was one of fourteen representatives of the American Society for African Culture at an international writers' meeting in Rome in 1959. He reported from the meeting for the New York Age. 

After his visit to Rome, Fax toured Africa, visiting such countries as Nigeria, Sudan, Egypt, and Ethiopia. He drew from these trips for sketches published in his first book, West African Vignettes. Fax returned to Europe for the Soviet Writers' Union meetings in 1971 and 1973, and the Bulgarian Writers' Conference in 1977. Sue Bailey Thurman donated works by Elton Fax to the "Heritage Hall" at Livingstone College in 1973.

Fax was a fellow at the MacDowell Colony in 1968. He received a Rockefeller Foundation Research Grant in 1976 to travel to Italy. Other awards included the Coretta Scott King Award from the American Library Association (1972) and the Chancellor's Medal from Syracuse University in 1990.

Personal life and legacy
In 1929, Elton Fax married Grace Elizabeth Turner. They had three children together.  The Fax family lived in Mexico for several years in the 1950s, and traveled widely.  He married as his second wife Elizabeth V. Murrell, a social worker. Elton Fax died in 1993, age 83, in Queens, New York.

Fax was the older brother of music scholar Mark Fax.

The papers of Elton Fax are at the New York Public Library, Boston University, and Syracuse University.

Works 

 Contemporary Black Leaders
 West African Vignettes
 Elyuchin
 Seventeen Black Artists
 Garvey: The story of a pioneer Black nationalist
 Through Black Eyes: Journeys of a Black Artist to East Africa and Russia
 Black Artists of the New Generation
 Hashar
 Soviet People as I Knew Them
 Tales from the story hat (illustrations only)
 The Seven Wishes of Joanna Peabody (illustrations only)
 Paul Cuffee: America's first black captain (illustrations only)
 Take a walk in their shoes (illustrations only)
 Dr. George Washington Carver, Scientist (illustrations only)

References

External links
 "Come, let us take counsel together" (A 1944 poster by Elton Fax, in the NAACP Collection, Prints and Photographs Division, Library of Congress.)
 "Finish the Fight! Join NAACP Now" (A 1946 poster by Elton Fax, in the NAACP Collection, Prints and Photographs Division, Library of Congress.)
8th annual youth conference, New Orleans, Louisiana, Nov. 21-24, 1946 (A 1946 poster by Elton Fax, in the NAACP Collection, Prints and Photographs Division, Library of Congress.)
Public Works of Art Project, Maryland Division Records finding aid, Archives and Manuscripts Collections, The Baltimore Museum of Art
Women viewing gallery, Contemporary Negro Art exhibition, The Baltimore Museum of Art, 1939.  Exhibitions Photograph Collection, Archives and Manuscripts Collection, The Baltimore Museum of Art

African-American artists
1909 births
1993 deaths
Works Progress Administration workers
20th-century African-American people